The discography of British singer-songwriter Katy B consists of three studio albums, four extended plays, fifteen singles and seventeen music videos.

Her first single, "Katy on a Mission", was released on 22 August 2010. The single reached number five on the UK Singles Chart and number one on the UK Indie Chart. Katy B performed at the London Jazz Festival in 2009 with Ms Dynamite, who also featured on Katy's second single, "Lights On" which was released in the United Kingdom on 19 December 2010, and debuted at number four on the UK Singles Chart. Her third single "Broken Record" was released in March 2011, and peaked at number eight. The fourth single "Easy Please Me" was released on 3 June 2011. Her fifth single "Witches' Brew" was released on 28 August 2011. Katy's debut album On a Mission was released on 4 April 2011, and peaked at number two on the UK Albums Chart. In 2011, Katy B and Mark Ronson teamed up for the song "Anywhere in the World" created as an advert for the Coca-Cola and the 2012 Summer Olympics, which was released as a digital download on 13 May 2012.

She released "What Love Is Made Of" in May 2013. "5 AM" was released in November 2013 as the lead single from her second studio album, peaking to number 14 on the UK Singles Chart. "Crying for No Reason" was released in January 2014 as the second single from her second studio album, which peaked at number 5. In February 2014, Katy B released her second studio album Little Red, which debuted at number 1 on the UK Albums chart and went on to be certified Silver. In April 2014 she released the album's third single "Still".

Alongside KDA and Tinie Tempah, Katy B reached number 1 in 2015 with "Turn the Music Louder (Rumble)". It is included on her third album Honey, which was released on 22 April 2016. Three singles have been issued from the album, including the official lead single "Who Am I", featuring Craig David.

Studio albums

Extended plays

Singles

As lead artist

Promotional singles

As featured artist

Other charted songs

Guest appearances

Music videos

Notes

References 

Discographies of British artists